Utara is the Malay word for north and can be found in topography. It is a loanword from the Sanskrit उत्तर, uttara (cf. Hindi उत्तर and Urdu اتر, uttar) which is also frequently found in topographic names, including the Indian states of Uttar Pradesh and Uttarakhand.

E.g. 
Sulawesi Utara -> North Sulawesi
Sumatera Utara -> North Sumatra
Maluku Utara -> North Maluku
Miscellaneous:
Utara Coal Mine
Utara University, Malaysia
Laluan MRT Utara Selatan, Singapore
Lebuhraya Utara-Selatan, Singapore

Indonesian words and phrases
Malay words and phrases